The M5 13 ton High Speed Tractor was a World War II era artillery tractor that was used by the US Army from 1942 to tow medium field artillery pieces.

Design

It could tow the gun and carry the gun's ammunition, the crew and their equipment.

The M5 was developed from the prototype T13 High-Speed Tractor, it shared the latter's Continental R6572 in-line six-cylinder petrol engine which developed  at 2,900 rpm and, like the T13 before it, derived its tracks and its vertical volute spring suspension from the Stuart tank.

Production
The design of the M5 High-Speed Tractor was standardized in October 1942, with production being undertaken by International Harvester, the design was to evolve into five marks.  The M5 was accepted into US Army service as the standard gun tractor used to tow the 105 mm Howitzer M2, the 4.5 inch Gun M1 and the 155 mm Howitzer M1. Standard ammunition stowage was:
 105 mm Howitzer M2 – 56 rounds
 4.5 inch Gun M1 – 38 rounds
 155 mm Howitzer M1 – 24 rounds

M5 High-Speed Tractor
Production of the original M5 High-Speed Tractor began in May 1943, running for 24 months with a total of 5,290 tractors produced. They had a simple folding top with side curtains for the protection of the gun crew from the elements, the driver was located in the front centre and there were inwards facing seats for total crew of 9.  After 1944 the vehicles were fitted with the M49C ring mount that allowed it to be armed with an M2 Browning machine gun for local and air defence.

M5A1 High-Speed Tractor
Introduced in May 1945, the M5A1 High-Speed Tractor introduced a new steel cab with the driver moving to the front left and forwards facing seats for the crew for a total crew of 11. A total of 589 M5A1s were produced before production ceased in August 1945.

M5A2 High-Speed Tractor & M5A3 High-Speed Tractor

M5A4 High-Speed Tractor
The M5A4 High-Speed Tractor reorganised the ammunition stowage boxes along the sides of the vehicle for easier access.

Users

World War II
The M5 High-Speed Tractor entered service with the US Army in 1943 and was one of the primary medium artillery prime movers along with the GMC CCKW 2½-ton 6x6 truck and the Diamond T 4-ton 6x6 truck. In 1944, 200 M5s were provided to an appreciative Soviet Union for use by the Red Army who quickly rushed them into service.

Post-war

The US Army continued to use the M5 during the Korean War, retiring them shortly afterwards.  Post-war surplus M5s were supplied to Austria, Belgium, Japan, Lebanon, Pakistan and Yugoslavia.

A number of M5 Tractors were used in British Columbia, Canada, as carriers for rock drills. The Chapman "Drilmobile", manufactured by Chapman Motor & Machine Shop of Delta, British Columbia was designed specifically for logging road construction.

Surviving examples
Surviving examples of the M5 High-Speed Tractors of various marks can be seen at:

 2 pieces in the Robert Gill Collection militarymuseum.at, Vienna, Austria 
 Marshall Museum, Lexington, Virginia.
 45th Infantry Division Museum, Oklahoma City.
 Museum of the American G.I., College Station, Texas.
 Armourgeddon Tank Driving, Husbands Bosworth, Leicestershire, England.
 Kansas Museum of Military History, Augusta, Kansas.
 Arkansas National Guard Museum, Little Rock, Arkansas.
 Lewis Army Museum, Fort Lewis, Washington.
A mostly intact but rusting M5 or M5A4 Tractor, complete with Continental engine, PTO winch, six 5-round side-mount ammunition lockers, and M2 Browning ring-mount can be found parked beside Route 96 in New York state, a few miles east of the town of Phelps. It has been recently removed from this location and its whereabouts are unknown.

See also
 List of U.S. military vehicles by supply catalog designation
 List of U.S. military vehicles by model number
 M4 Tractor
 M6 Tractor

References

External links 

 M5 High-Speed Tractor, 13-ton
Lebanese Army M5 High-Speed Tractor
M5 High-Speed Tractors at a Lebanese Army parade in 1972

Artillery tractors
Military vehicles of the United States
World War II vehicles of the United States
International Harvester vehicles
Military vehicles introduced from 1940 to 1944